Local Band Does OK (stylized as Local Band Does O.K.) is Umphrey's McGee's second studio album, and the first studio album to feature Jake Cinninger and Andy Farag. This album also marks the final studio appearance of original drummer Mike Mirro, who was replaced by Kris Myers prior to the band's next album. The album contains extensive forays into progressive rock and large-scale composition. At the inaugural Bonnaroo Festival in the summer of 2002, the album sold more copies than any other album over the weekend.

This is the earliest available Umphrey's McGee album on CD, as the band's three previous efforts are all out of print except as part of the CustUm Flash Drive released in December 2009.

Track listing

Notes
 Michael "Maddog" Mavridoglou on trumpet in "Andy's Last Beer" and "Headphones & Snowcones".
 Rich Cohen on alto saxophone in "Andy's Last Beer".

Personnel
Brendan Bayliss - guitar, vocals, rattlesnake tails
Jake Cinninger - guitar, Moog Taurus II, dobro, drums, talking box, vocals, djembe
Joel Cummins - electric piano, Fender Rhodes, organ, synthesizer, kalimba, vocals
Ryan Stasik - bass guitar, jaw harp, rainstick
Mike Mirro - drums, marimba, vocals
Andy Farag - congas, bongos, timbales, percussion, groovebox

Graphic Design: Rob Heimbrock

References

Umphrey's McGee albums
2002 albums